Lili Meeuwisse (born 26 May 1959) is a Dutch rower. She competed in the women's quadruple sculls event at the 1980 Summer Olympics.

References

External links
 

1959 births
Living people
Dutch female rowers
Olympic rowers of the Netherlands
Rowers at the 1980 Summer Olympics
Sportspeople from The Hague
20th-century Dutch women